Below are the rosters for the EFA European Under-16 Football Championship 1995 tournament in Belgium.

Group A

Head coach:

Head coach:
http://www.figc.it/nazionali/ConvocatiGara?squadra=5&codiceGara=1247
ANDORNO DAVIDE 	F.C. JUVENTUS SPA
CIASCA FABIO 	A.S. ROMA SPA
CINGOLANI NICOLA 	F.C. JUVENTUS SPA
DAINO DANIELE 	A.C. MILAN SPA
DAN MARZIO 	F.C. JUVENTUS SPA
FORLANI OMAR 	CALCIO BRESCIA SPA
GIANDOMENICO LUIGI 	F.C. JUVENTUS SPA
GUASTALVINO PAOLO 	A.C. PERUGIA SPA
LAMBRUGHI MARCELLO 	A.C. MILAN SPA
LO GATTO PIERO 	TORINO CALCIO SPA
MACCAFERRI STEFANO 	BOLOGNA F.C. 1909 S.R.L.
MAFFEIS OMER 	CALCIO BRESCIA SPA
MALAGO MARCO 	A.C. VENEZIA 1907 S.R.L.
PIRLO ANDREA 	CALCIO BRESCIA SPA
POLIZZANO ANDREA 	A.S. LODIGIANI S.R.L.
REGONESI PIERRE GIORGIO 	ATALANTA BERG.SCA C.-SPA
RUGGINI ALESSANDRO 	A.S. LODIGIANI S.R.L.

Head coach:  Andrzej Zamilski

Head coach:

Group B

Head coach:

Head coach:Marc Van Geersom

Head coach:

Head coach:

Group C

Head coach: Bernd Stober

Head coach:Mahmut Kapidzic

Head coach: Juan Santisteban

Head coach: Necati Özcaglayan

Group D

Head coach:

Head coach:Rui Caçador

Head coach:

Head coach:

UEFA European Under-17 Championship squads